Agathidium is a genus of beetles in the family Leiodidae.

A. bushi, A. cheneyi and A. rumsfeldi are species of this genus named after George W. Bush, Dick Cheney and Donald Rumsfeld, respectively, by two former Cornell entomologists, Kelly B. Miller (now at the University of New Mexico) and Quentin D. Wheeler. According to Miller and Wheeler, the naming of the beetles (which were three of 65 species to be named) was done in homage to the political figures. The same authors named A. vaderi after the fictional Darth Vader.

Some species can roll themselves up into an almost complete sphere, similar to pillbugs. Some males have horns on their left mandibles to dislodge rival males.

Species

References

External links

 Press Release from Cornell News

Leiodidae
Staphyliniformia genera
Articles containing video clips